The Seafarer 38 is an American sailboat that was designed by Philip Rhodes as a cruiser and first built in 1971.

The Seafarer 38 was also sold as the Rhodes 38, Seafarer 38 Ketch and the Seafarer 38C.

Production
The design was built by Seafarer Yachts in the United States, starting in 1971, but it is now out of production.

Design
The Seafarer 38 is a recreational keelboat, built predominantly of fiberglass, with wood trim. It has a masthead sloop rig, optional cutter rig or optional ketch rig. Short or tall masts were also options, as was a bowsprit for the cutter rig.

The hull has a clipper bow; a raised counter, angled transom; a keel-mounted rudder controlled by a wheel and a fixed, modified long keel, with a cutaway forefoot. It displaces  and carries  of lead ballast.

The boat is fitted with a British Perkins Engines 108 diesel engine for docking and maneuvering.

The design has sleeping accommodation for six people, with a double "V"-berth in the bow cabin, an "U"-shaped settee in the main cabin around a drop-down table and an aft cabin with two single berths. The galley is located on the starboard side just forward of the companionway ladder. The galley is equipped with a three-burner stove, an ice box and a double sink. A navigation station is opposite the galley, on the starboard side. The head is located just aft of the bow cabin on the port side and includes a shower.

See also
List of sailing boat types

References

External links
Photo of a Seafarer 38 sloop

Keelboats
1970s sailboat type designs
Sailing yachts
Sailboat type designs by Philip Rhodes
Sailboat types built by Seafarer Yachts